Kendall is a census-designated place (CDP) in Whatcom County, Washington, United States. The population was 191 at the 2010 census.

History
Kendall was founded in 1887 by F.B. Hardmen.  It was named for the settler Carthage Kendall.
Limestone quarrying featured in the area for at least 75 years. A seam of high-quality stone was in the flank of Sumas Mountain. The limestone was used for riprap, cement, and construction. The Milwaukee Road railroad had a spur from Bellingham to move the blocks. Abandoned tracks crossing the highway near the Pair-o-dice Tavern mark the location of the mine.

Geography
Kendall is located at  (48.919393, -122.137511).

According to the United States Census Bureau, the CDP has a total area of 0.9 square miles (2.2 km2), of which, 0.8 square miles (2.1 km2) of it is land and 0.04 square miles (0.1 km2) of it (2.35%) is water.

Kendall is at the junction of Washington State Route 542 (the Mount Baker Highway) and State Route 547, which leads over a low pass on the northeastern flank of Sumas Mountain to connect to the town of Sumas and the border crossing with Abbotsford, British Columbia, Canada.  The community of Maple Falls is three miles east along the Mount Baker Highway, which leads to the Mount Baker Ski Area.

Demographics
As of the census of 2000, there were 158 people, 50 households, and 36 families residing in the CDP. The population density was 191.6 people per square mile (74.4/km2). There were 63 housing units at an average density of 76.4/sq mi (29.7/km2). The racial makeup of the CDP was 91.77% White, 4.43% Native American, and 3.80% from two or more races. Hispanic or Latino of any race were 0.63% of the population.

There were 50 households, out of which 42.0% had children under the age of 18 living with them, 54.0% were married couples living together, 14.0% had a female householder with no husband present, and 28.0% were non-families. 22.0% of all households were made up of individuals, and 2.0% had someone living alone who was 65 years of age or older. The average household size was 3.16 and the average family size was 3.81.

In the CDP, the age distribution of the population shows 38.6% under the age of 18, 7.6% from 18 to 24, 25.9% from 25 to 44, 21.5% from 45 to 64, and 6.3% who were 65 years of age or older. The median age was 28 years. For every 100 females, there were 116.4 males. For every 100 females age 18 and over, there were 106.4 males.

The median income for a household in the CDP was $24,821, and the median income for a family was $24,821. Males had a median income of $17,000 versus $18,750 for females. The per capita income for the CDP was $13,450. Most of the population or families were below the poverty line.

References

Census-designated places in Washington (state)
Census-designated places in Whatcom County, Washington